The 2007 season was the Minnesota Vikings' 47th in the National Football League. The Vikings' 8–8 record under second-year head coach Brad Childress was an improvement on their 6–10 record in 2006; nonetheless, for the third straight year, the Vikings failed to make the playoffs.

Although they had the worst pass defense in the NFL in 2007, surrendering 4,225 passing yards, the Vikings finished the season with the league's best defense against the run, allowing only 74.1 rushing yards per game, as well as the best rushing offense with running backs Adrian Peterson and Chester Taylor. Peterson was named the Offensive Rookie of the Year for 2007.

Offseason
The Vikings began the 2007 offseason by losing their defensive coordinator, Mike Tomlin, who was hired to be the head coach of the Pittsburgh Steelers on January 21, 2007. Coach Brad Childress waited until after the Super Bowl to hire Leslie Frazier, who served as special assistant to the head coach/defensive backs coach under Tony Dungy at the Indianapolis Colts. Frazier became the Vikings' new defensive coordinator on February 8. Frazier played cornerback for the 1985 Chicago Bears, and had just won Super Bowl XLI over his former Bears team when he was hired by the Vikings.

Draft

 The Vikings traded their second-round selection (41st overall) to the Atlanta Falcons in exchange for Atlanta's second- and fourth-round selections (44th and 121st overall, respectively).
 The Vikings traded a fourth-round selection (106th overall) and a sixth-round selection (182nd overall) to the Tampa Bay Buccaneers in exchange for Tampa Bay's fourth-round selection (102nd overall).
 The Vikings traded a fourth-round selection (121st overall) to the Denver Broncos in exchange for Denver's sixth- and seventh-round selections (176th and 233rd overall), and a third-round selection in the 2008 Draft.

Transactions

Preseason

Schedule

Game summaries

Week 1: vs. St. Louis Rams

Week 2: at New York Jets

Week 3: at Seattle Seahawks

Week 4: vs. Dallas Cowboys

Regular season

Schedule

Note: Intra-division opponents are in bold text.

Game summaries

Week 1: vs. Atlanta Falcons

The Vikings began their 2007 campaign at home against the Atlanta Falcons. In the first quarter, Minnesota scored first with defensive tackle Kevin Williams returning an interception 54 yards for a touchdown. It was the only score of the first half. In the third quarter, kicker Ryan Longwell kicked a 49-yard field goal. In the fourth quarter, the Falcons got their only score of the game, with Matt Prater kicking a 45-yard field goal. From there, the Vikings had the only offense with Tarvaris Jackson throwing a 60-yard touchdown pass to rookie running back Adrian Peterson. Cornerback Antoine Winfield returned an interception 14 yards for a touchdown.

Week 2: at Detroit Lions

Following their home win over the Falcons, the Vikings flew to Ford Field for a Week 2 divisional match-up with the Detroit Lions. After a scoreless first quarter, Minnesota trailed early as Lions quarterback Jon Kitna completed a 9-yard touchdown pass to wide receiver Roy Williams. The Vikings tied the game with a 1-yard touchdown run from quarterback Tarvaris Jackson. However, Detroit retook the lead with kicker Jason Hanson's 30-yard field goal.

In the third quarter, the Lions increased their lead with a 7-yard touchdown pass from J. T. O'Sullivan – who was in for the injured Kitna – to Calvin Johnson. Minnesota tied the game through a 32-yard field goal from Ryan Longwell and a 9-yard fumble return touchdown from defensive end Ray Edwards. After both teams failed to score in the fourth quarter, the Vikings received the ball first to begin overtime. However, nine plays into the Vikings' drive, Detroit recovered a fumble by backup Vikings quarterback Brooks Bollinger for the game's 10th overall turnover, allowing Hanson's to kick a 37-yard, game-winning field goal.

Week 3: at Kansas City Chiefs

Following their divisional road loss to the Lions, the Vikings flew to Arrowhead Stadium for an interconference duel with the Kansas City Chiefs. In the first quarter, the Vikings' rookie running back Adrian Peterson got an 11-yard touchdown run for the only score of the period. In the second quarter, Minnesota increased their lead via a 22-yard Ryan Longwell field goal. The Chiefs ended the half with kicker Dave Rayner getting a 39-yard field goal.

In the second half, Kansas City were the only team to score. In the third quarter, the Chiefs drew closer with Rayner kicking a 49-yard field goal, before closing out the win in the fourth quarter with quarterback Damon Huard completing a 16-yard touchdown pass to Dwayne Bowe.

Week 4: vs. Green Bay Packers

Trying to snap a two-game losing streak, the Vikings returned home for an NFC North duel with the Green Bay Packers. With regular starting quarterback Tarvaris Jackson recovering from injuries, Kelly Holcomb started in his place. In the first quarter, the Vikings trailed early as Brett Favre threw a 16-yard touchdown pass to Greg Jennings, surpassing Dan Marino with the 421st touchdown pass of his career. After Favre was honored for his accomplishment, Minnesota narrowed the margin between the two teams to a single point with field goals of 44 and 35 yards from kicker Ryan Longwell, before Mason Crosby hit a 28-yard field goal to restore a four-point lead for the Packers going into halftime.

In the third quarter, Crosby and Longwell cancelled each other out with field goals from 44 yards and 48 yards, respectively. In the fourth quarter, Crosby made a 33-yard field goal, before Favre completed a 33-yard touchdown pass to James Jones. Minnesota tried to rebound with Holcomb completing a 15-yard touchdown pass to rookie wide receiver Sidney Rice. The Vikings failed with an attempted onside kick, but two plays later Chad Greenway recovered a fumble by Favre, giving the Vikings just under 2 minutes to go 54 yards for a game-tying touchdown. However, after moving into Green Bay territory, Holcomb was subsequently intercepted by Atari Bigby, allowing Favre to kneel out the game.

Adrian Peterson ran 12 times for 112 yards, making him the first rookie running back since Chuck Foreman to rush for 100 yards in each of his first three games as a Vikings starter.

Week 6: at Chicago Bears

Coming off their bye week, the Vikings went to Soldier Field for a Week 6 NFC North contest against the Chicago Bears. In the first quarter, Minnesota trailed early as Devin Hester returned a punt 89 yards for a touchdown. The Vikings responded with a 60-yard touchdown pass from Tarvaris Jackson to Troy Williamson. In the second quarter, Chicago's Brian Griese completed a 39-yard touchdown pass to Bernard Berrian. Afterwards, Minnesota answered with a 67-yard touchdown run from Adrian Peterson.

In the third quarter, the Vikings took the lead with 73-yard touchdown run from Peterson for the only score of the period. Kickers Ryan Longwell and Robbie Gould traded field goals of 48 and 32 yards to start the fourth quarter, before Peterson scored his third touchdown of the game on a 35-yard run. Chicago tied the game again with Griese completing a 33-yard touchdown pass to Muhsin Muhammad, followed by an 81-yard touchdown pass to Hester. But on the ensuing kickoff, Peterson sprinted all the way down to the Chicago 38-yard line, setting Longwell up for a 55-yard, game-winning field goal.

With the win, the Vikings improved to 2–3, largely in part to Peterson's 224 rushing yards, which put him fifth for the most rookie rushing yards in one game. Up to this point, he had a total of 607 rushing yards, which placed him second for the most rookie rushing yards through the first five games, only behind Eric Dickerson. He also broke the NFL record for most all purpose yards in a single game, with 361.

Week 7: at Dallas Cowboys

Coming off their impressive divisional road win over the Bears, the Vikings flew to Texas Stadium for a Week 7 intraconference duel with the Dallas Cowboys. In the first quarter, Minnesota trailed early as Cowboys quarterback Tony Romo completed a 5-yard touchdown pass to Terrell Owens. The Vikings responded with a 20-yard touchdown run from Adrian Peterson. In the second quarter, Minnesota scored a bizarre defensive touchdown, as Antoine Winfield forced a fumble from Cowboys receiver Patrick Crayton; linebacker Ben Leber recovered the ball and ran with it before lateraling it to Cedric Griffin; Griffin then also fumbled the ball, but it bobbled back up into his hands and he was able to run it in for a touchdown.

In the third quarter, the Vikings began to struggle as Cowboys running back Marion Barber III scored a 1-yard touchdown, before safety Pat Watkins returned a blocked field goal 68 yards for a touchdown. In the fourth quarter, Dallas closed out the win with kicker Nick Folk getting a 45-yard field goal.

Week 8: vs. Philadelphia Eagles

Hoping to rebound from their road loss to the Cowboys, the Vikings came home for a Week 8 intraconference duel with the Philadelphia Eagles that saw head coach Brad Childress go up against his mentor, Philadelphia coach Andy Reid. With starting quarterback Tarvaris Jackson out with a thumb injury, veteran backup Kelly Holcomb got the start.

In the first quarter, Minnesota took an early lead as Holcomb completed a 9-yard touchdown pass to tight end Visanthe Shiancoe. The Eagles responded with a 20-yard David Akers field goal, before running back Brian Westbrook scored a 6-yard touchdown catch followed by a 1-yard run to put the Eagles up 17–7. Minnesota's only response for the period was a 39-yard field goal from kicker Ryan Longwell.

In the third quarter, Akers and Longwell traded field goals from 27 and 32 yards. Longwell then drew the Vikings to within four points on a 48-yard field goal with just under 9 minutes to play in the game, only for Akers to seal the win for the Eagles on a 25-yard field goal.

Holcomb (7/16 for 88 yards and 1 touchdown) was concussed on a sack in the third quarter, resulting in Brooks Bollinger (7/10 for 94 yards) coming in to finish the game.

Week 9: vs. San Diego Chargers

Hoping to rebound from their home loss to the Eagles, the Vikings stayed at home and played a Week 9 interconference game against the San Diego Chargers. The two teams were level by the end of the first quarter, following 1-yard touchdown runs from both Chargers running back LaDainian Tomlinson and the Vikings' Adrian Peterson. The second quarter then went scoreless until the very last play of the half, when kicker Ryan Longwell came up short on a 57-yard field goal attempt, which Antonio Cromartie returned 109 yards for a touchdown, the longest possible play in the game.

The Vikings scored a pair of long touchdowns in the third quarter, as Peterson scored on a 64-yard run, followed by a 40-yard pass from Brooks Bollinger to Sidney Rice. The Chargers narrowed the Vikings' lead to four points in the fourth quarter on a 36-yard field goal by Nate Kaeding, but another long touchdown run of 46 yards from Peterson and a 2-yard score from fellow running back Chester Taylor sealed a 35–17 win for the Vikings.

Peterson had 30 carries for 296 rushing yards, setting a new league record for a single game, along with three touchdowns.

Quarterback Tarvaris Jackson (6/12 for 63 yards) started the game, but was concussed in the second quarter and replaced by Brooks Bollinger.

Week 10: at Green Bay Packers

Playing their first road game in three weeks, the Vikings traveled to Lambeau Field to play their long-time rivals, the Green Bay Packers.

In the first half, a 30-yard run by Ryan Grant gave the Packers a 7–0 lead, and two field goals by Mason Crosby (a 39-yard field goal midway through the 2nd quarter and a 24-yard field goal at the end of the half) provided all the first half scoring, as the Vikings went to the locker room trailing 13–0.

The Packers completed the shutout with Brett Favre throwing a pair of third-quarter touchdown passes, one to Donald Lee and one to Ruvell Martin. Martin scored again in the fourth quarter. The Vikings were shut out 34–0, the first time the Vikings had been shut out in the regular season since 1991.

Adrian Peterson suffered a knee injury in the third quarter and left the game.

With the loss, Minnesota fell to 3–6 and were swept by the Packers.

Week 11: vs. Oakland Raiders

Hoping to rebound from their divisional road loss to the Packers, the Vikings' Week 11 opponent was the Oakland Raiders, who had former Vikings quarterback Daunte Culpepper under center. After a 79-yard pass from wide receiver Sidney Rice to Visanthe Shiancoe on the first play from scrimmage, the Vikings scored on the very next play on a 10-yard run from Chester Taylor. This was followed by a safety when Culpepper was penalized for intentional grounding in his own endzone. Two plays after the ensuing free kick, the Vikings fumbled the ball just inside Oakland territory, allowing the Raiders to set up a 42-yard field goal for Sebastian Janikowski. On the next drive, the Vikings restored their nine-point lead as kicker Ryan Longwell hit a 30-yard field goal on the first play of the second quarter. A short Oakland drive culminating in 10-yard touchdown pass from Culpepper to tight end John Madsen, followed by another Janikowski field goal, saw the Raiders take the lead for the first time. Four plays later, Minnesota regained a six-point lead on a 38-yard touchdown run from Taylor, but field goals of 42 and 49 yards from Janikowski meant the first half ended with the scores level at 19–19.

The Vikings recorded the only score of the third quarter on a 38-yard field goal from Longwell, though they did finish the period on the Raiders' 6-yard line, allowing Taylor to run in his third touchdown on the opening play of the fourth quarter, the first time in his career that he scored three touchdowns in one game. A 52-yard field goal from Janikowski narrowed the margin to 7 points with less than three-and-a-half minutes to play, and after forcing the Vikings to punt just inside the two-minute warning, they had one last chance to level the scores. On the first play of the drive, Culpepper threw the ball in the direction of Justin Fargas, who tipped it up, allowing Chad Greenway to come up with an interception; he went to ground with the ball, but inexplicably got up and attempted to advance it, which allowed left tackle Barry Sims to force a fumble, recovered by right guard Paul McQuistan. That enabled the Raiders to extend their drive, but although they managed to get into Vikings territory, a false start penalty meant Culpepper had to attempt a Hail Mary pass on the final play, but it came up short, giving the Vikings a 29–22 win.

Week 12: at New York Giants

Coming off their home win over the Raiders, the Vikings flew to the Meadowlands for a Week 12 matchup with the New York Giants. In the first quarter, the Vikings scored first as QB Tarvaris Jackson completed a 60-yard TD pass to WR Sidney Rice. The Giants responded with RB Reuben Droughns getting a 1-yard TD run. Minnesota regained the lead with safety Darren Sharper returning an interception 20 yards for a touchdown. In the second quarter, the Vikings continued their scoring as RB Chester Taylor got an 8-yard TD run, while kicker Ryan Longwell managed to get a 46-yard field goal.

In the third quarter, New York tried to come back as kicker Lawrence Tynes hit a 26-yard field goal. Minnesota answered with Longwell kicking a 26-yard field goal. In the fourth quarter, the Vikings pulled away with safety Dwight Smith returning an interception 93 yards for a touchdown, along with LB Chad Greenway returning an interception 37 yards for a touchdown. The Giants' only response was QB Eli Manning's 6-yard TD pass to WR Plaxico Burress.

With the win, the Vikings improved to 5–6.

Minnesota's league-worst pass defense had a big game as they intercepted Eli Manning four times (one from Sharper, two from Smith and one from Greenway), with three of them getting returned for touchdowns (which is the most since the 1984 Seahawks returned 4 picks in one game). It set a franchise record for the most interception return yards in one game with 169.

Week 13: vs. Detroit Lions

Coming off their road win over the Giants, the Vikings went home for a Week 13 divisional rematch with the Detroit Lions. In the first quarter, Minnesota scored first as RB Chester Taylor completed a 2-yard TD run. The Lions replied with kicker Jason Hanson hitting a 37-yard field goal. In the second quarter, Minnesota answered with rookie RB Adrian Peterson getting a 16-yard TD run. Detroit responded with QB Jon Kitna completing a 1-yard TD pass to TE/FB Casey Fitzsimmons. Afterwards, the Vikings immediately scored with rookie WR Aundrae Allison returning a kickoff 103 yards for a touchdown (a franchise best), while QB Tarvaris Jackson completing a 6-yard TD pass to WR Bobby Wade and a 2-yard TD pass to WR Sidney Rice. In the third quarter, Peterson added a 13-yard TD run.

With the win, the Vikings improved to 6–6.

This was the first time since their 15–1 season of 1998 that they were able to get 40+ points in back-to-back games.

Week 14: at San Francisco 49ers

After their home win over the Lions, the Vikings flew to Bill Walsh Field at Monster Park for a Week 14 contest with the San Francisco 49ers. In the first quarter, Minnesota scored first as DT Kevin Williams returned an interception 18 yards for a touchdown, along with kicker Ryan Longwell getting a 48-yard field goal. In the second quarter, the Vikings added to their lead as QB Tarvaris Jackson completed a 19-yard TD pass to WR Robert Ferguson. Longwell hit a 46-yard field goal, and RB Chester Taylor completed an 84-yard TD run. In the third quarter, the 49ers got their only score of the game as QB Shaun Hill completed a 5-yard TD pass to WR Arnaz Battle.

With the win, Minnesota improved to 7–6.

Rookie RB Adrian Peterson ended the day with a career-low 3 yards rushing on 14 carries.

Week 15: vs. Chicago Bears

After the west coast win over the 49ers, the Vikings went home for a Week 15 Monday night NFC North rematch with the Chicago Bears. Chicago's kicker Robbie Gould kicked a 29-yard field goal for the only score of the first quarter. In the second quarter, Minnesota responded with kicker Ryan Longwell getting a 42-yard field goal. Chicago took the halftime lead with Gould kicking a 47-yard field goal and FB Jason McKie getting a 1-yard TD run.

In the third quarter, the Vikings started to rally as rookie RB Adrian Peterson got a 1-yard TD run (with a failed PAT) for the only score of the period. In the fourth quarter, the Vikings took the lead as Peterson got an 8-yard TD run. The Bears were unable to score in the second half.

With the win, the Vikings improved to 8–6.

Week 16: vs. Washington Redskins

After the Monday night win over the Bears, the Vikings hosted the Washington Redskins. With a win, the Vikings clinched an NFC playoff berth. The Redskins also needed a win to avoid elimination. Washington scored the only points in the first half, leading 22–0 at halftime on a safety and three touchdowns. Passes by Todd Collins to Chris Cooley and Santana Moss as well as a pass from Clinton Portis to Antwaan Randle El completed the scoring. 
After a field goal by Washington's Shaun Suisham to start the second half at 25–0, Minnesota answered with two touchdowns by Tarvaris Jackson: one a short pass to Jim Kleinsasser, the other a 6-yard rush. Each team scored an additional touchdown in the fourth quarter, bringing the final score to 32–21.

With the loss, the Vikings fell to 8–7, matching the Redskins' record. In order to secure a playoff spot, the Vikings needed a win in Denver in week 17, as well as a loss by the Redskins against the Dallas Cowboys. Because of this loss in week 16, if the Redskins won their last game, the Vikings would be eliminated from the playoffs regardless of the outcome of the Denver game.

Week 17: at Denver Broncos

In the final game of the season, the Vikings lost in overtime to the Broncos. Trailing in the fourth quarter by 16, Minnesota was able to score two touchdowns (both passes from Tarvaris Jackson to Bobby Wade), and complete two two-point conversions, (both quarterback runs by Jackson) to tie the game at 19. In overtime, the Vikings had the ball first, but on the second play of their drive, Jackson was hit by Alvin McKinley and fumbled. The ball was recovered by Elvis Dumervil on Minnesota's 13 yd line. Jason Elam kicked a 30-yard game-winning field goal.

The Vikings finished with an 8–8 record and were eliminated from playoff contention due to the Redskins' victory over the Dallas Cowboys 27–6.

Standings

Statistics

Team leaders

League rankings

Pro Bowl
The Vikings had seven players selected to the 2008 Pro Bowl. Starting on offense were RB Adrian Peterson, fullback Tony Richardson and offensive guard Steve Hutchinson. Starting at defense were defensive tackles Kevin Williams and Pat Williams as well as strong safety Darren Sharper. The reserve center was Matt Birk. Only one team, the Dallas Cowboys, had more starters (7). Besides the seven named players for Minnesota, kicker Ryan Longwell was named a first alternate, and special teams player Heath Farwell and left tackle Bryant McKinnie were named second alternates.

Staff

Roster

Notes and references

2007
Minnesota
Minnesota